Celestaphone (born 1996) is an American hip hop music producer

Celestaphone may also refer to:

 Celestaphone (instrument), a musical instrument of the zither family.